Poljane is a small settlement on the road from Cerkno towards Dolenji Novaki in the traditional Littoral region of Slovenia.

References

External links
Poljane on Geopedia

Populated places in the Municipality of Cerkno